Ma Chung-pei is an astrophysicist and cosmologist. She is the Judy Chandler Webb Professor of Astronomy and Physics at the University of California, Berkeley. She led the teams that discovered several of largest known black holes from 2011 to 2016.

Biography
Ma was born in Taiwan to parents Huang Chao-heng and Ma Chi-shen. She started playing violin at the age of four. She attended Taipei Municipal First Girls' Senior High School and won the Taiwan National Violin Competition in 1983. She then attended the Massachusetts Institute of Technology (MIT), receiving her bachelor of science degree in physics in 1987. She earned a PhD in physics from MIT in 1993. She studied theoretical cosmology and particle physics with Alan Guth and Edmund W. Bertschinger, her doctoral advisors. A violin prodigy as a teenager in Taiwan, winning a national violin competition in Taipei when she was 16, she also took violin classes during her college years at MIT at Boston's New England Conservatory of Music.

From 1993 to 1996 Ma had a postdoctoral fellowship at the California Institute of Technology. From 1996 to 2001 she was an associate and assistant professor at the University of Pennsylvania. While there she won the Lindback Award for Distinguished Teaching. She became a professor of astronomy at UC Berkeley's Department of Astronomy in 2001.

Ma's research interests are the large-scale structure of the universe, dark matter, and the cosmic microwave background. She led the team that discovered the largest known black holes in 2011.

Ma was the scientific editor in cosmology for The Astrophysical Journal.

Awards and honors
1987 – Phi Beta Kappa Society
1997 – Annie Jump Cannon Award in Astronomy (American Astronomical Society)
1999 – Sloan Fellowship
2003 – Maria Goeppert-Mayer Award (American Physical Society)
2009 – American Physical Society Fellow 
2012 – American Association for the Advancement of Science Fellow
2012 – Simons Foundation Fellow
2020 – American Academy of Arts and Sciences Member
2022 - American Astronomical Society Fellow
2022 - National Academy of Sciences Member

Selected publications

See also
 Timeline of women in science

References

External links
Behemoth Black Hole Found in an Unlikely Place, accessed 8 April 2016.
Sarah Lewin, Surprise! Gigantic Black Hole Found in Cosmic Backwater, accessed 8 April 2016.
Dark Matter, the Other Universe, presentation by Ma, SETI Institute (video)

Living people
American astrophysicists
American cosmologists
MIT Center for Theoretical Physics alumni
Taiwanese astronomers
Taiwanese emigrants to the United States
Taiwanese women physicists
University of California, Berkeley faculty
Women astronomers
Fellows of the American Physical Society
21st-century Taiwanese scientists
21st-century Taiwanese women
21st-century American scientists
Recipients of the Annie J. Cannon Award in Astronomy
Fellows of the American Association for the Advancement of Science
1966 births
MIT Department of Physics alumni
Fellows of the American Academy of Arts and Sciences
Sloan Fellows